Almásfüzitő is a village in Komárom-Esztergom county, Hungary.  During the Oil Campaign of World War II, the Almásfüzitő oil refinery was bombed by the United States Army Air Forces.

Popular culture
In the 2014 video game Metal Gear Solid V: Ground Zeroes, an audio tape can be found. On this tape, the heavily-scarred antagonist Skull Face describes a traumatizing incident from his childhood in which the weapons factory his parents worked at was bombed; his parents were killed and he was maimed by burning hot oil. The events told seem to align with the real-life events of the bombing. Adding further credence to his story is that Skull Face occasionally speaks Hungarian to his underlings.

References

Populated places in Komárom-Esztergom County
Oil campaign of World War II